Nong Thum is a tambon (subdistrict) of Seka District, in Bueng Kan Province, Thailand. In 2020 it had a total population of 7,118 people.

History
The subdistrict was created effective June 8, 1987 by splitting off 8 administrative villages from Sang.

Administration

Central administration
The tambon is subdivided into 13 administrative villages (muban).

Local administration
The whole area of the subdistrict is covered by the subdistrict administrative organization (SAO) Nong Thum (องค์การบริหารส่วนตำบลหนองทุ่ม).

References

External links
Thaitambon.com on Nong Thum

Tambon of Bueng Kan province
Populated places in Bueng Kan province
Seka District